The Cray EL90 series was an air-cooled vector processor supercomputer first sold by Cray Research in 1993. The EL90 series evolved from the Cray Y-MP EL minisupercomputer, and is compatible with Y-MP software, running the same UNICOS operating system. The range comprised three models:

 EL92, with up to two processors and 64 megawords (512 MB) of DRAM in a deskside chassis: dimensions 42×23.5×26 inches or 1050×600×670 mm (height × width × depth) and 380 lb/172 kg in weight.
 EL94, with up to four processors and 64 megawords (512 MB) of DRAM, in the  same cabinet as the EL92.
 EL98, a revised Y-MP EL with up to eight processors and 256 megawords (2 GB) of DRAM in a Y-MP EL-style cabinet (62×50×32 inches or 2010×1270×810 mm, 1400 lb/635 kg in weight).

The EL90 series Input/Output Subsystem (IOS) was based on the VMEbus and a Heurikon HK68 Motorola 68000-based processor board (or IOP). The IOP also provided the system's serial console. All EL90 models could be powered from regular mains power.

The EL90 series was superseded by the Cray J90 series.

References
 Fred Gannett's Cray FAQ
 Cray EL boot sequence

Computer-related introductions in 1993
El90
Vector supercomputers